This list of the oldest schools in the United Kingdom contains extant schools in the United Kingdom established prior to 1700 and a few former schools established prior to the Reformation. The dates refer to the foundation or the earliest documented contemporary reference to the school. In many cases the date of the original foundation is uncertain. For conciseness schools whose date is cited on their own page in Wikipedia are not cited again here. Though not technically in the United Kingdom, one school (Elizabeth College) in Guernsey – which forms part of the British Isles – is included in this list.

England

Sixth century

 The King's School, Canterbury (abbey founded  in 597, apparently related to a school of royal charter 1541)

Seventh century
 The King’s School, Rochester (founded 604, refounded 1541)
 The Minster School, York (song school founded 627, refounded 1903, closed 2020)
 St Peter's School, York (627, Royal charter 1550s)
 Thetford Grammar School (631, mentioned 1114, refounded 1566)
 Hereford Cathedral School (676, mentioned 1384)
 Royal Grammar School Worcester (685, first conclusive evidence 1291, Royal charter 1561)
 Carlisle Grammar School (priory school founded 685)
 Beverley Grammar School (c.700)

Eighth century
 Sherborne School (705, royal charter 1550)
 The Pilgrims' School, Winchester (c.900)

Tenth century
 Warwick School (914, royal charter 1545)
 Wells Cathedral School (909)
 St Albans School (c.948, refounded 1549)
 The Minster School, Southwell (minster founded 956, first mention 1313, refounded 1547)
 King's Ely (970)

Eleventh century
 Bedford School (1086, refounded 1552)
 Salisbury Cathedral School (1091)
 Norwich School (1096, refounded 1547 as "King Edward VI Grammar School")
 Abingdon School (possibly as old as 1100, endowed 1256, refounded 1563)

Twelfth century
 St Paul's Cathedral School (founded 1123)
 Colchester Royal Grammar School (1128, Royal Charters 1539, re-founded 1584)
 Reading School (1125 as the school of Reading Abbey, refounded 1486, Royal charter 1541)
 The King's School, Pontefract (1139, refounded 1548)
 Bristol Cathedral School (abbey founded 1140, refounded 1542)
 Derby School (1160, refounded 1554)
 Exeter Cathedral School (founded 1179)

Thirteenth century

 Lancaster Royal Grammar School (mention of master 1235, endowed 1472)
 Louth Grammar School (earliest reference 1276, refounded 1551 as King Edward VI Grammar School, Louth)
 Stratford Grammar School (1295, refounded 1553 as King Edward VI School, Stratford-upon-Avon)

Fourteenth century
 Stamford School (1309, re-endowed 1532)
 Northallerton School (1323)
 Hanley Castle High School (chantry school 1326, charter 1544)
 The King's School, Grantham (1329, refounded 1528)
 Bourne Grammar School (earliest record of existence 1330, endowed 1636)
 The King's School, Ottery St Mary (1335, refounded 1545)
 Bablake School (1344)
 Doncaster Grammar School now Hall Cross School, (first record of existence 1350)
 Beauchamp College (first record of existence 1359)
 Westminster School (first record of existence 1371, Royal charter 1541 and 1560)
 Prince Henry's High School (c. 1376, refounded 1605)
 New College School (1379)
 Wisbech Grammar School (1379, Royal charter 1549)
 Winchester College (1382)
 Katharine Lady Berkeley's School (Royal licence in 1384)
 Penistone Grammar School (1392)
 Ipswich School (1399, Royal Charter 1566)

Fifteenth century
 Oswestry School (1407)
 Durham School (1414, refounded 1541)
 Chorister School (1416)
 Royal Latin School (first mention 1423, Royal charter 1548)
 Sponne School (chantry founded 1430)
 Sevenoaks School (1432)
 Chipping Campden School (c1440)
 Eton College (1440)
 King's College School, Cambridge (1441)
 City of London School (1442)
 St Dunstan's College (earlier than 1446)
 Hartismere School (founded 1451)
 St. Bartholomew's School,  Newbury (1466)
 Bromsgrove School (record of a chantry school 1476, re-founded 1553)
 Magdalen College School, Oxford (1480)
 Thomas Rotherham College (1483)
 Stockport Grammar School (1487)
 Pott Shrigley (1492)
 Ermysted's Grammar School (record of a chantry school 1492, re-founded 1548)
 Lichfield Grammar School (1495, refounded as King Edward VI School, Lichfield )
 Loughborough Grammar School (1495)
 The Prebendal School (1497)
 Queen Elizabeth's School, Wimborne Minster (1497)
 
 Giggleswick School (1499, Royal charter 1553)

Sixteenth century

Seventeenth century

Wales

Thirteenth century
 Ruthin School (c.1284, refounded 1574)

Sixteenth century
 Christ College, Brecon (1541)
 King Henry VIII School, Abergavenny (1542)
 Friars School, Bangor (1557)
 John Beddoes School (1565)

Seventeenth century
 Ysgol David Hughes Ynys Môn (1603)
 Hawarden High School (1606)
 Monmouth School (1614)
 Botwnnog School (1616)
 The Bishop Gore School, Swansea (1682)
 Llanrwst Grammar School (1610)

Scotland

Twelfth century
 High School of Glasgow (pre-1124)
 Royal High School, Edinburgh (1128)
 Stirling High School (High School of Stirling) (1129)
 Lanark Grammar School (1183)
 Kirkwall Grammar School (1200)

Thirteenth century
 Ayr Academy (1233)
 High School of Dundee (1239)
 Aberdeen Grammar School (possibly c. 1257, earliest mention 1418)

Fourteenth century

 Knox Academy (Haddington Grammar School) (1379)

Fifteenth century

 Brechin High School (1429)
 Dunfermline High School first founded in 1120 refounded (1468)
 Dumbarton Academy (earliest reference 1485)

Sixteenth century

 Montrose Academy (c. 1534, earliest evidence of schooling 1329)
 Leith Academy (1560)
 Paisley Grammar School (1576)
 Kirkcudbright Academy (earliest record of existence 1582)

Seventeenth century

Musselburgh Grammar School (1626)
George Heriot's School (1628)
 Hutchesons' Grammar School (1641)
 Dunoon Grammar School (1641)
 Campbeltown Grammar School (1686)
 The Mary Erskine School (1694)
Perth Academy (1696)

Northern Ireland

Seventeenth century

 The Royal School, Armagh (1608)
 Royal School Dungannon (1614)
 Foyle College (1617)
 Portora Royal School (1618)

Channel Islands

Sixteenth century
 Elizabeth College (1563)

See also
List of founders of English schools and colleges
List of the oldest schools in the world
Education in England
Education in Scotland
Education in Wales
Education in Northern Ireland
Armorial of UK schools

References for schools not having their own page

Lists of schools in the United Kingdom
List of the oldest schools in the United Kingdom
United Kingdom, schools
Schools, oldest
Lists of education-related superlatives
United Kingdom